The 1979 Tirreno–Adriatico was the 14th edition of the Tirreno–Adriatico cycle race and was held from 9 March to 14 March 1979. The race started in Santa Severa and finished in San Benedetto del Tronto. The race was won by Knut Knudsen of the Bianchi team.

General classification

References

1979
1979 in Italian sport
March 1979 sports events in Europe